Foster Hutchinson (1724–1799) was an associate justice of Massachusetts Superior Court of Judicature, the highest court of the Province of Massachusetts Bay.  One of five judges in Massachusetts at the time of the American Revolution, he remained loyal to Britain.  He was a younger brother of Loyalist Massachusetts Governor Thomas Hutchinson.  He was a graduate of Harvard University (1743). He escaped Boston as a loyalist in 1776 and settled in Halifax, Nova Scotia.  He took the probate records of Suffolk Co. where he was Judge of Probate and never released them until 1784, when Benjamin Kent was able to procure their surrender.  He re-printed examples of rebel propaganda in the local newspaper for which he later was forced to apologize. He was the father of Foster Hutchinson, also a jurist in Nova Scotia. He was buried in Halifax's Old Burying Ground.

See also 
Nova Scotia in the American Revolution

References 

History of Nova Scotia
Loyalists who settled Nova Scotia
Harvard University alumni
Harvard College Loyalists in the American Revolution
American Loyalists from Massachusetts
Justices of the Massachusetts Superior Court of Judicature
1724 births
1799 deaths
People of colonial Massachusetts